Peter McPherson (May 17, 1874 – November 8, 1941) was an American football player and coach and a longtime dentist.

Biography
McPherson played halfback at Wadsworth Normal and Training School (now SUNY Geneseo) from 1896 to 1897 and later at the University at Buffalo from 1898 to 1900 while attending dental school.  He served as the head coach at Miami University in Oxford, Ohio from 1902 to 1903, compiling a record of 6–7–1.

McPherson later worked as a dentist in Caledonia, New York and coached the Caledonia High School football team for 23 years.  He died in 1941 after succumbing to injuries sustained when struck by a car.

Head coaching record

References

External links
 Peter McPherson, Football halfback - University at Buffalo Libraries Digital Collections

1874 births
1941 deaths
19th-century players of American football
American dentists
American football halfbacks
Buffalo Bulls football players
Geneseo Knights football players
Miami RedHawks football coaches
High school football coaches in New York (state)
People from Caledonia, New York